Cemal Gürsel (13 October 1895 – 14 September 1966) was a Turkish army general who became the fourth President of Turkey after a coup.

Early life 
He was born in the city of Erzurum as the son of an Ottoman Army officer, Abidin Bey, and the grandson of Ibrahim (1820–1895) and the great-grandson of Haci Ahmad (1790–1860). After the elementary school in Ordu and the military middle school in Erzincan, he graduated from the Kuleli military high school in Istanbul. He was a popular figure and was therefore nicknamed "Cemal Ağa" (big brother Cemal) since his childhood school years and onwards all his life. 
Gürsel served in the Army for 45 years. During World War I, he participated in the Battle of Çanakkale in Dardanelles, Gallipoli as a lieutenant with the First Battery of the 12th Artillery Regiment in 1915 and received the War Medal. He later fought at the Palestine and Syria fronts in 1917 and became a prisoner of war by the British while suffering malaria during his command of the 5th Battery of the 41st Regiment on 19 September 1918. Gürsel was kept as a prisoner of war in Egypt until 6 October 1920. During his presidency much later, when interviewed by the foreign press as to why he had not learned English during his captivity, he somewhat regretfully recalled that he was so frustrated to be a captive, he protested and studied French in the British camp instead.

After his release, Cemal Gürsel returned to Anatolia to re-join Mustafa Kemal subsequent to Erzurum Congress and took part in all the western front campaigns in the Turkish War of Independence between 1920 and 1923. He was promoted for gallantry in the First Division excelling in the battles of Second Inönü, Eskişehir and Sakarya, and was later awarded the Medal of Independence by the first Parliament for his combat service in the Final Offensive.

Gürsel was married, in 1927, to Melahat, the daughter of the chief engineer on the Ottoman cruiser Hamidiye. From this marriage, a son Özdemir was born. The couple adopted a daughter Türkan.

Military career 
Cemal Gürsel attended the Turkish Military College and graduated in 1929 as a staff officer. He was promoted colonel in 1940. He was made a brigadier general in 1946  and made commander of the 65th Division. He was later the commander of the 12th Division, the 18th Corps commander, and commander of the 2nd Interior Tasks District. Made Lieutenant general in 1953, was general in 1957, being appointed Commander of 3rd Army. Service included chief of intelligence, and he was appointed as the Commander of Land Forces in 1958 when he was commanding an army.

Gürsel, as an easy-going and fatherly figure with a fine sense of humor, was well liked both nationally and in NATO circles, and had earned the respect and confidence of both the nation and the armed forces with his professional knowledge and demeanor. A patriotic memorandum he sent on 3 May 1960 to the Minister of Defense in an effort to establish checks and balances on ongoing affairs, reflecting his personal views in continuation of the chat they had the night before, expressing his support to the prime minister Adnan Menderes and belief that the Prime Minister should replace the President with immediate effect to bolster a much needed national unity, resulted in his suspension from his post, forcing early retirement instead of becoming the next Chief of the Turkish General Staff.

A farewell letter by him, advocating and urging the army to stay out of politics, was forwarded to all units of the armed forces at the time of his departure on leave. Cemal Gürsel's statement read: 'Always hold high the honor of the army and the uniform you wear. Protect yourselves from the current ambitious and harmful political atmosphere in the country. Stay away from the politics at all cost. This is of utmost importance to your honor, the army's might and the future of the country.' He went to İzmir where he became the president of the Anti-Communism Association of Turkey.

Head of state 

A coup d'état organised and conducted by army officers at the rank of colonels and below took place without the participation or leadership of Cemal Gürsel on 27 May 1960 after continuing civilian and academia unrests throughout the country. It is rumored that four-star general Ragıp Gümüşpala, the Commander of the Third Army based in Eastern Anatolia, gave an ultimatum to the rebelling officers that if they did not have a general appointed as their head, the Third Army would attack to take over the capital and the administration of the country, thereby forcing the rebel group to find a senior officer over them. Because of his immense popularity among the public and military ranks, Gürsel was subsequently chosen by the revolutionaries overnight and brought into the chairmanship of the military coup and became, the only leader in the world put into power by a military takeover who had previously had no role in its planning or execution. He, while still in his pajamas, was escorted to Ankara in the military C-47 transport plane by a captain who was the youngest officer of the radical coup team who that by that time had already sent President Celal Bayar, Prime Minister Adnan Menderes, Chief of General Staff Rüştü Erdelhun and some other members of the ruling Democratic Party to a military court on Yassıada in the Sea of Marmara, accusing them of violation of the constitution. The day after the coup, four-star general Cemal Gürsel was declared the commander in chief, Head of state, Prime minister and Minister of Defense of the 24th government on 30 May 1960, in theory giving him more absolute powers than even Kemal Atatürk had ever had.

Gürsel freed 200 students and nine newsmen, and licensed 14 banned newspapers to start publishing again (Time, 6 June 1960). He fetched ten law professors, namely Sıddık Sami Onar, Hıfzı Veldet Velidedeoğlu, Ragıp Sarıca, Naci Şensoy, Hüseyin Nail Kubalı, Tarık Zafer Tunaya, İsmet Giritli, İlhan Arsel, Bahri Savcı and Muammer Aksoy, accompanied by Erdoğan Teziç, a law postgraduate student as their assistant (later Chairman of the Turkish Council of Higher Education), from Istanbul and Ankara Universities to help draft a new constitution on 27 May, right after he arrived in Ankara. During their first meeting with General Cemal Gürsel on the same day, Prof. Onar declared on behalf of the group of law academicians that 'the circumstances of the day should not be interpreted as an ordinary and political coup d'état, implying the revolution being brought by the change process starting in the republic that day. President Cemal Gürsel also formed a scientific council to guide the Ministry of Defence, later forming the Scientific and Technological Research Council of Turkey to advise the government more broadly.

He appointed General Ragıp Gümüşpala, the commander of the Third Army, as the new Chief of the General Staff who, upon his retirement in two months, was succeeded by General Cevdet Sunay, and Gümüşpala was further directed by Gürsel to form the new Justice Party to bring together the former members of the Democratic Party.  A simple and conservative sort, Gürsel became Turkey's most popular figure, forbade display of his picture alongside Atatürk's in government offices, rode about in an open Jeep touring rural communities, talking to the peasants almost as if they were his children (Time, 6 January 1961). He was successful with his personal interventions in reducing the number of execution verdicts from the Yassıada trials from 15 down to three. Gürsel's plea for forgiveness and attempts along with several other world leaders for the reversal of the execution sentences and for the release of Adnan Menderes and two other ministers were rejected by the Junta. A member of the National Unity Committee writes in his memoirs that, upon Cemal Gürsel's intervention on the prevention of Menderes' execution, the chief prosecutor of the tribunal, Altay Ömer Egesel, said: ‘Let us hurry! They will save him (Menderes)!’, also arranging a contingency plan for conducting the execution in a Navy Destroyer in the event of a forgiveness operation in Imrali Island to save Menderes while, at the same time, placing a press release questioning the legal ability of Gürsel for an intervention. Senator Mehmet Feyyat, District Attorney of Istanbul at the time, recently declared: ‘They cut off our phone lines. Adnan Menderes was hanged against the regulations. I was supposed to oversee the execution. The revolution tribunal's chief prosecutor Egesel conducted the execution despite not being authorized. İsmet İnönü and Cemal Gürsel were already phoning for him (Menderes) not to be executed but the telecommunications office cut off the lines and Egesel made use of the (communication) gap to conduct the execution. Cemal Gürsel resisted pressure to continue military rule, Through direct efforts of then PM İsmet İnönü during his presidency military has thwarted two military coup attempts made by Talat Aydemir, appointed the organizers of the coup who were keen on staying in power by force of arms such as Alparslan Türkeş to overseas posts and played an important role in the preparation of a new constitution and return to the democratic order of the Kemalist vision.

Statesman 

Cemal Gürsel rescheduled and attended the previously cancelled Turkish and Scottish national football teams' game in Ankara on 8 June 1960 (Turkey 4, Scotland 2) which was followed by a National Football Tournament, the Cemal Gürsel Cup, that helped boost the national morale in the post-coup weeks with finals in Istanbul on 3 July (Fenerbahçe 1, Galatasaray 0). He took an active role in extensive modernization of Turkish Armed Forces and the staunch defense of the free world and Europe during the cold war, in particular during the Cuban Missile Crisis. The declaration of independence of Cyprus according to the prior agreements and the deployment of a Turkish military unit to Cyprus took place in August 1960. He hosted the visit of Queen Elizabeth II to Ankara in early 1961 and the visit of the vice president Lyndon Johnson in 1962. Gürsel obtained, with the coordinated work of Sir Bernard Burrows, and granted permission of the ruling military National Unity Committee (NUC) for British military combat aircraft to overfly Turkish airspace on their way to support Kuwait, which was under threat of invasion by Iraq in July 1961.

When questioned by a German journalist regarding his intentions on becoming the next president upon proposal of the interim parliament, Cemal Gürsel responded that he was ready to serve only if asked by the nation, not by the interim house. He neither put his own candidacy forward for the presidency nor lobbied for his election or against any other candidate in any way. He offered his endorsement of candidacy of several high rank academicians in Medicine and Sciences in Ankara for both the interim prime minister and future president positions. Gürsel placed a special emphasis on participatory democracy with the promotion of the full interests of the nation's minorities, appointing Turkish Citizen ethnic leaders Hermine Kalustyan of Armenian, Kaludi Laskari of Greek and Erol Dilek of Jewish origin as his "Deputy Representatives of Head of State" and the full members of the interim House of Representatives. The editor of Shalom, Avram Leyon, accompanied him on his travels and foreign state functions. He re-established the freedom of speech that was overwhelmingly taken away from the media organs and from the press by the previous cabinet.

The constitution, which brought for the first time a full text of civil and political rights under constitutional protection along with an improved system of checks and balances in Turkish history, was approved by a referendum held on 10 October 1961. With the establishment of the first Constitutional Court that created a new paradigm shift by scrutinizing the parliamentary rulings as the "checks" organ in 1961 and the addition of a Senate to the parliament, the Turkish Grand National Assembly was re-opened after the general elections, nominated and voted him as the fourth president of Turkey. Journalist Parliamentarian Cihat Baban claims in his book, The Gallery of Politics (Politika Galerisi) that Cemal Gürsel told him "We may solve all troubles if Süleyman Demirel becomes the head of the Justice Party (Adalet Partisi). I am working very hard for him become the party leader. If I succeed in this, I will be happy.." Demirel was elected chairman at the second grand party convention on 28 November 1964. The President of the Republic of Turkey Cemal Gürsel assigned the mandate to form and serve as the Prime Minister of the new government to İsmet İnönü in November 1961, June 1962 and December 1963, to Senator Suat Hayri Ürgüplü in February 1965 and, following the general elections, to Suleyman Demirel of Justice Party in October 1965.

With the reduction of tensions between the West and the Soviet bloc, Gürsel sought improved relations for his country's population of 27.8 million with the Soviet Union, such as the initiation of a telephone line agreement, as with the other members of the Western alliance while initiating new credit agreements with the US and the UK as well as bilateral technical and investment relations with Germany in 1960s.

The atomic reactor in Istanbul became operational in 1962 along with his establishment of the first Research and State Library of the government in two years after his administration started. He promoted the grant of the freedom of and the legal rights to form unions and to go on strike in the country. Turkish Universities gained autonomous independence by law for the first time upon the legislation he passed. Cemal Gürsel granted a presidential pardon for the life sentences of the previous president Celal Bayar and the former chief of general staff Rustu Erdelhun whose prior execution sentence was also revoked by the National Unity Committee upon Gürsel's appeals. He initiated the new era of planned economy in Turkey, formed a State Institute of Statistics, launched the State Planning Organization (DPT) that implemented "The First 5-Years Development Plan", arranged re-entry of the Turkish Republic in the United Nations Security Council in 1961 and moved Turkey, through his close and personal diplomatic dialogues with Charles de Gaulle and Konrad Adenauer, into the direction of European Union membership with the Ankara Agreement, signed with France, Belgium, Netherlands, Germany, Italy and Luxembourg in 1963, resulting in associate membership the following year and a large Turkish workforce migration to Germany and Western Europe to assist their postwar industrial development.

When a Cypriot leader who was exiled out of the UK previously in 1956 on the basis of his struggle for Cypriot independence from the British rule, wanted in November 1963 to amend the basic articles of the 1960 constitution, communal violence ensued and Turkey, Great Britain and Greece, the guarantors of the agreements which had led to Cyprus' independence, wanted to send a NATO force to the island under the command of General Young. Due to the continued ethnic violence between the Cypriot Turks and Cypriot Greeks, President Gürsel ordered warning flights and subsequent continuous air assaults by the Turkish Air Force against the island which continued between 7 and 10 August 1964, ending with the fulfilment of the military objectives of Turkey, and the invitation to calm by Nikita Khrushchev of USSR.

Cemal Gürsel reformed the "Teskilat-i Mahsusa", the "Special Organization" of clandestine security services to a modern National Intelligence Agency in response to and preparation against escalating international terrorism trends in 1963. He paved the way to Middle Eastern countries and Pakistan to concentrate on economic and cultural matters of mutual interest and Ankara recognized Syria following the breakup of the short-lived United Arab Republic in 1961, further reestablishing diplomatic relations with Egypt in 1965. In July 1964, Pakistani President Ayub Khan, Turkish President Cemal Gürsel, and Shah Mohammad Reza Pahlavi of Iran announced in Istanbul the establishment of the Regional Cooperation for Development (RCD) organization to promote transportation and joint economic projects also envisioning Afghanistan and possibly Indonesia joining at some time in the future. He granted asylum to the political dissidents Ayatollah Khoumeini of Iran and Molla Barzani of Iraq.

Gürsel, 40 years after the foundation of the Republic, launched the first radio broadcasting station of Eastern Anatolia within the centrally located province of Erzurum, where Ankara and Istanbul radios’ transmissions were not received. He brought the Microwave Telecommunications Network into operation increasing telephone and teletype capacity along with a High-Frequency Radio Link connecting London and Ankara with Rawalpindi, Karachi, Tehran and Istanbul. He laid the foundations of the new agricultural and structural development plans for the south-eastern Anatolian regions in early 1960s for the first time. With his directive, The Holy Relics from the Prophets Abraham, Moses, Joseph, David and Muhammad, including the oldest Qur'an in existence from the 7th Century were put on display from their storage rooms within the Topkapi Palace for public viewing for the first time on 31 August 1962. Gürsel added the first Ministry of Culture and Tourism to the cabinet. In a parallel effort of promoting the country's touristic popularity in the West, Topkapi), the movie version of the book by Eric Ambler that had been commissioned for the same purpose, was shot in Paris and Istanbul and was introduced with success. Similarly, one of the favorite books of John F. Kennedy, Ian Fleming's From Russia with Love was shot in Istanbul as the second James Bond movie, to promote the touristic popularity of Turkey, with his keen interest. The Directorate of Religious Affairs network of the country was founded with his directive and became operational on 22 June 1965. He started the new procedure of returning the law proposals presented for the President's approval back to the Parliamentary re-discussions in 1963. Cemal Gürsel founded The National Security Council (MGK) as well as the Scientific and Technological Research Council of Turkey (TUBITAK) in 1963, appointing Professor Cahit Arf as its first director, officially charging TUBITAK primarily with governmental advisory duty by legislation. In addition to the foundation of the Turkish Radio and Television (TRT) organization as a government agency in 1964 that brought television broadcasting to Turkey for the first time under his administration, the opening of The School of Press and Broadcasting at the college of Political Sciences in Ankara followed in November 1965. The country's new initiative of Planning of Population Growth Control was put in effect in 1965. The production of the first domestic Turkish automobile, the Devrim (Revolution), took place with Cemal Gürsel's directive which sparked the initiation of an automotive industry in the republic in the following few years. The first use of a computer in the country, iron and steel mass production growth, the thermic power plant and a petrol pipeline structuring took place during his presidency. Cemal Gürsel refused remuneration for his Head of State and subsequent Presidential positions and made his and his family's living with his retired general's salary, meeting their own expenses during their life in the Presidential Palace in Çankaya, Ankara.

Illness 
Because of a paralysis that started in early 1961 and progressed quickly in 1966, on 2 February Cemal Gürsel was flown to the Walter Reed Army Medical Center in Washington, D.C. on the private airplane "BlueBird" sent by US President Lyndon B. Johnson. One week later, he fell into a coma there after suffering a series of new paralytic strokes. The government decided he return to Turkey on 24 March. President Johnson travelled by helicopter from the White House to Andrews Air Force Base, Maryland, near Washington, D.C., to pay his respects to President Cemal Gürsel on his departure to home, In addition to issuing the following statement 'Our distinguished friend, President Cemal Gursel of Turkey, came to the United States on 2 February for medical treatment. There was hope that new therapeutic procedures only recently developed in this country would be useful in treating his illness of several years. We were initially encouraged by his progress at Walter Reed Hospital, only to be shocked by the news on 8 February that his health had suffered a grave new blow. Our best talent, coupled with the skill of the eminent Turkish doctors who accompanied the President, was exerted to the utmost in the hope that the President might return to his home in fully restored health. We are saddened that this hope was not to be realized. We have been deeply honored to have President Gürsel come to our country to seek medical treatment. As he returns to his homeland, our prayers go with him'. With a report of a medical committee by Gülhane Military Hospital in Ankara, the parliament ruled on 28 March 1966 that his presidency be terminated due to ill health in accordance with the constitution. He died of apoplexy at 6:45 pm on 14 September 1966 in Ankara. He left behind no directives or last will. He was laid to rest at the "Freedom Martyrs Memorial" section in the yard of the mausoleum of Atatürk. His body was transferred on 27 August 1988 to a permanent burial place in the newly built Turkish State Cemetery.

Legacy 
Among all of his achievements and great modesty in his down-to-earth plain demeanor, he tried to place the most emphasis on the need for a well-educated youth and a hard-working population with high standards of ethics for a westernized democratic progress in Atatürk's tradition (commentary by Imran Oktem, Chief Supreme Court Justice – Yargitay, 1966). His portrait as a statesman and soldier remained next to Atatürk's in most homes in Turkey for a long time. Erzurum Cemal Gürsel Stadium, some schools and streets were named after him. The developments during his term were described as the "Turkish Revolution" which was celebrated annually on 27 May as the Constitution Day until 1981. In 2002, a commemorative coin was released for the same. In 2008, the movie The Cars of Revolution was released in his memory.

Quotes from him 
 "I took over the administration of the state to stop the tragic course of events." (Cemal Gürsel, radio address on the evening of 27 May 1960)
 "The network was ready. I personally did not want the army to intervene and had been stopping the attempts (of takeover) of my younger friends. Things reached to such a state that despite my belief that the army should not interfere I let them free in their duties. Now my only goal is to reinstate an administration built on the principles of justice and ethics." (Cemal Gürsel, An interview. Cumhuriyet, 16 July 1960)
 "Those who follow Atatürk will not be left behind." (Cemal Gürsel, from the address on the occasion of the 25th anniversary of Atatürk's death, 10 November 1963)

Quotes about him 

 "General Gursel may be described as the father of the second Turkish Republic similar to Atatürk being the father of modern Turkey. At a time of deep division, Gursel earned and maintained the respect of the Turkish Nation that regarded him as the symbol of national unity. When he passed away, he had the identity of the trusted father of the nation." (Prof. Bernard Lewis, 15 September 1966)
 "A few days before the coup, it was known that the coup was imminent but General Cemal Gursel was dismissed as a non-political general. No leading role by General Cemal Gursel was determined despite the foreknowledge of the plot." (The CIA; The Inside Story by Andrew Tully, pages 51, 53. Crest books, 1962)
 "On 27 May, he (Cemal Gursel) was hurriedly requested to come (from his residence in İzmir) to the capital (Ankara) to assume the leadership of National Unity Committee." (The Turkish Revolution, Aspects of Military politics. By Walter Weiker. pages 121, 122. The Brookings Institution, 1963)
 "When 27 May revolt occurred, Cemal Gürsel was not a participant. He was invited to become the head due to the circumstances and he willingly accepted." (Burhan Felek, Milliyet, Page 2, 18 September 1971)
 "General Gürsel was brought into the NUC chairmanship by the revolution team when he was in retirement preparation. In actuality he was in the position of a chairman found in last minute with a hurried search. He never was the responsible leader for a true leader is not to be appointed but is self-appointed." (By a leading member of the NUC)
 "One of the core players of the coup, Orhan Erkanli told that they revolted on 27 May without knowing what to do on 28 May. No one, including Cemal Gürsel knew who and how many would be forming the NUC. In actuality, even Cemal Gürsel was brought in later." (Years of Ismet Pasha of our Democracy, 1960–61 by Metin Toker, page 25. Bilgi. 1998)
 "It is now known that the coup was the result of years of planning on the part of conspirators, a number of radical colonels and ranks below in their early forties. He (Cemal Gürsel) was not involved in the details of the organization of the coup d'état. When the coup had succeeded, he was brought to Ankara." (Turkey, A modern History by Erik Zurcher. pages 253,254. I.B. Tauris, 2003)
 "We just see that a few very important lines in his letter (to the Minister of Defence) had been censored. That means we are going without learning the true history, without knowing who knows what facts and what true pictures of turning points." (Çetin Altan, Author, Journalist, September 2006)
 "An extremely important document that sheds light on the past has been revealed. Testimony from eyewitnesses at the time helped make known that the letter had been modified after 27 May, but the location of the original letter was unknown. This important document adds a new dimension to the 27 May revolution. We have come face to face with a new document that changes our written history. It was my greatest wish to obtain just such a document; not for my own satisfaction, but for my father, to prove this reality and obtain genuine evidence. I was thrilled when I heard about this." (Mr Aydın Menderes, Author, the Son of Prime Minister Adnan Menderes, September 2006)
 "They cut off our phone lines. Adnan Menderes was hung against the regulations. I was supposed to oversee the execution. The revolution tribunal's chief prosecutor Altay Egesel conducted the execution despite not being authorized. İsmet İnönü and Cemal Gürsel were already phoning for him (Adnan Menderes) not to be executed but the telecommunications' office cut off the lines and Egesel made use of the (communication) gap to conduct the execution." (Mehmet Feyyat, District Attorney General, Istanbul Province Prosecutor General 1961, The Administrator of the Imrali Prison, The Lawyer of the Year, Senator.  (Reported by Özkan GÜVEN, STAR Newspaper, 13 November 2006 with a summary in Turkish at Law in the Capitol)
 "Where are we now and where are the nations such as Portugal, Greece and Spain with whom we departed for the competition of development in 1960s? While we still crawl around $5000 per capita income, they have caught $20K pci a long while ago. In one word, an embarrassment." (Hasan Cemal, Milliyet, October 2006)
 "We built an automobile with the mentality of the West and we forgot to put gasoline in it with the mentality of the East." (Cemal Gürsel, President, on the Anniversary of the Turkish Republic, 29 October 1963)

See also
1962 attempted coup in Turkey

References 

Song of The Pharaohs — The Kings of the East and the West
Analysis of political scene on 26 May 1960, research article (in Turkish)
General Gursel hosting HM Queen Elizabeth's first visit to Turkey, Ankara, 1961
1960–1962 Landmarks of Turkish History
1963–1966 Landmarks of Turkish History
The full translated text of Cemal Gursel's letter The research copy of the Turkish original
Cemal Gursel's Memorandum Revealed
His video and photographs at the President's Web Page
Cemal Gursel with Vice President Lyndon Johnson in Ankara, 1962 (Anatolian Agency Album)
60's video montage
U.S. Presidential Messages search Cemal Gursel
 Text of Ankara Agreement
The movie "The Cars of Revolution"
His photos in LIFE Magazine
Cyprus, 1964. Video footage of massacres and offensives against Turkish Community
Cable from US Embassy reflecting collective efforts of Cemal Gursel, Ismet Inonu and his entire cabinet and Gen Cevdet Sunay to stop executions

1895 births
1966 deaths
20th-century prime ministers of Turkey
20th-century presidents of Turkey
People from Erzurum
Kuleli Military High School alumni
Turkish Military Academy alumni
Army War College (Turkey) alumni
Turkish Army generals
Commanders of the Turkish Land Forces
Ministers of National Defence of Turkey
Prime Ministers of Turkey
Presidents of Turkey
Burials at Turkish State Cemetery
Recipients of the Medal of Independence with Red Ribbon (Turkey)
Leaders who took power by coup
Members of the 24th government of Turkey
Members of the 25th government of Turkey